Glad Christmas Tidings was recorded during the Mormon Tabernacle Choir's 2010 Christmas shows in the LDS Conference Center with special guests David Archuleta and Michael York. The album was released on September 6, 2011 along with a concert DVD.  The recorded concert was broadcast on PBS during December 2011 to more than 4 million Americans and is the No. 1-rated entertainment program on PBS during the holidays each year, according to PBS CEO Paula Kerger. As of November 2011, the album had sold in excess of 28,000 copies.

Track listing

Charts

Year-end charts

References

Tabernacle Choir albums
2011 Christmas albums
Christmas albums by American artists